Tommy Kraemer (born April 16, 1998) is an American football offensive guard for the Detroit Lions of the National Football League (NFL). He played college football for Notre Dame.

Personal life and high school
Tommy Kraemer was born on April 16, 1998, in Cincinnati, Ohio. He attended Elder High School, where he protected future Northwestern and rival quarterback Peyton Ramsey. After his successful time at Elder High School, Kraemer won the Gatorade Ohio Player of the Year award.

College career
Kraemer was rated as the fourth-best player from the state of Ohio going into college and chose to attend University of Notre Dame. In his freshman year, Kraemer never was entered into a game. In his sophomore year, Kraemer started his first game and later started twelve out of the thirteen games that season. Kraemer helped create a powerful rushing offense that averaged 269.3 rushing yards per game, seventh in the FBS. In his junior year, Kraemer played in twelve games and started in ten of them. In his senior season, Kraemer started the first seven games before suffering a season-ending knee injury versus Michigan. During that season, Kraemer had not allowed a single sack before getting injured. In his graduate and final season, Kraemer once again started ten out of the twelve games that season. Following his graduate year, Kraemer was named on the first team All-ACC team and the All-American third team.

Professional career

After going undrafted in the 2021 NFL Draft, Kraemer was signed as an undrafted free agent by the Detroit Lions. Kraemer was waived before the 2021 NFL season began, but was placed on the practice squad. Before week 8 of the 2021 NFL season, Kraemer was promoted to the active roster. He was waived on November 2 and re-signed to the practice squad. He was promoted back to the active roster on November 23.

On September 15, 2022, Kraemer was placed on injured reserve with a back injury.

References

1998 births
Living people
American football offensive guards
Players of American football from Cincinnati
Notre Dame Fighting Irish football players
Detroit Lions players